Johannes Henricus Gerardus Jansen (9 May 1868 – 6 February 1936) was a former Archbishop of Utrecht and Roman Catholic Primate of the Netherlands. He was born in Leeuwarden, in the Dutch province of Friesland.

On 11 April 1930 he was named Archbishop of Utrecht and then consecrated by Lorenzo Schioppa, the Apostolic Internuncio to Netherlands, at the time. On 6 February 1936 died in Utrecht and was buried in the metropolitan cathedral.

References

1868 births
1936 deaths
Archbishops of Utrecht
20th-century Roman Catholic archbishops in the Netherlands
People from Leeuwarden
Dutch Roman Catholic archbishops